The 2011 Mercury Insurance Open was a women's tennis tournament played on outdoor hard courts. It is the 2nd edition of the Southern California Open since the tournament left the tour in 2007. It is classified as one of the WTA Premier tournaments of the 2011 WTA Tour. It takes place in Carlsbad, California, United States. Agnieszka Radwańska won the singles title.

Finals

Singles

 Agnieszka Radwańska defeated  Vera Zvonareva 6–3, 6–4.
It was Radwańska's first title of the year and fifth overall.

Doubles

 Květa Peschke /  Katarina Srebotnik defeated  Raquel Kops-Jones /  Abigail Spears 6–0, 6–2

Entrants

Seeds

 Seedings are based on the rankings of July 25, 2011.

Other entrants
The following players received wildcards into the singles main draw
  Gisela Dulko
  Alexa Glatch
  Aravane Rezaï
  Sloane Stephens

The following players received entry from the qualifying draw:

  Gréta Arn
  Jill Craybas
  Marina Erakovic
  Natalie Grandin
  Rika Fujiwara
  Marie-Ève Pelletier
  Zoë Gwen Scandalis
  Ashley Weinhold

The following player received entry as a lucky loser into the singles main draw:
  Olga Savchuk

References

Mercury Insurance Open
Mercury Insurance Open
Southern California Open
Mercury Insurance Open
Mercury Insurance Open